Laila Øygarden (born 6 June 1947) is a Norwegian politician for the Labour Party.

She served as a deputy representative to the Parliament of Norway from Aust-Agder during the term 1977–1981. Following the 2007 elections, Øygarden became the new county mayor (fylkesordfører) of Aust-Agder. She sat through one term, until 2011. Before this, she was the deputy county mayor from 1955 to 2007.

She also chaired ØIF Arendal from 2011 to 2014.

References

See also
 Odvar Nordli 
Reiulf Steen
Gro Harlem Brundtland

1947 births
Living people
People from Arendal
Deputy members of the Storting
Chairmen of County Councils of Norway
Labour Party (Norway) politicians
Norwegian women in politics
Norwegian sports executives and administrators
Women members of the Storting